The list of shipwrecks in 1935 includes ships sunk, foundered, grounded, or otherwise lost during 1935.

January

1 January

2 January

3 January
For the loss of the Norwegian cargo ship Sisto on this day, see the entry for 19 December 1934.

4 January

6 January

8 January

9 January

11 January

13 January

14 January

15 January

17 January

18 January

19 January

21 January

22 January

24 January

25 January

26 January

27 January

28 January

29 January

30 January

Unknown date

February

2 February

4 February

5 February

7 February

8 February

9 February

12 February

14 February

15 February

16 February

18 February

20 February

21 February

22 February

24 February

25 February

27 February

28 February

March

1 March

2 March

6 March

15 March

20 March

25 March

Unknown date

April

1 April

2 April

5 April

7 April

9 April

10 April

11 April

15 April

24 April

25 April

26 April

27 April

May

1 May

2 May

6 May

7 May

8 May

9 May

13 May

15 May

17 May

19 May

20 May

22 May

30 May

June

5 June

7 June

8 June

10 June

12 June

20 June

21 June

22 June

23 June

25 June

26 June

July

1 July

2 July

3 July

4 July

6 July

7 July

9 July

12 July

14 July

15 July

18 July

19 July

22 July

23 July

25 July

28 July

30 July

August

1 August

2 August

3 August

4 August

6 August

8 August

14 August

16 August

17 August

19 August

21 August

23 August

25 August

26 August

27 August

28 August

29 August

September

2 September

3 September

4 September

5 September

7 September

17 September

18 September

19 September

23 September

24 September

25 September

26 September

27 September

28 September

29 September

30 September

October

2 October

3 October

8 October

10 October

15 October

16 October

17 October

19 October

20 October

21 October

22 October

23 October

25 October

27 October

29 October

30 October

31 October

November

1 November

2 November

3 November

4 November

5 November

7 November

9 November

11 November

12 November

13 November

17 November

18 November

19 November

20 November

21 November

22 November

25 November

26 November

30 November

Unknown date

December

1 December

2 December

3 December

4 December

5 December

6 December

9 December

10 December

18 December

19 December

20 December

21 December

23 December

24 December

25 December

26 December

28 December

29 December

30 December

Unknown date

References

1935
Shipwrecks